Alan Jesús Acosta Montañez (born December 19, 1996, in Ecatepec de Morelos, State of Mexico) was a Mexican professional footballer who last played for Puebla on loan from UNAM.

External links
 

Living people
1996 births
Association football midfielders
Club Universidad Nacional footballers
Club Puebla players
Liga MX players
Liga Premier de México players
Tercera División de México players
People from Ecatepec de Morelos
Footballers from the State of Mexico
Mexican footballers